Agudas Achim or Agudath Achim ( Agudat Aḥim; "Association of Brothers") is the name of several synagogues.

Congregation Agudath Achim (Ashland, Kentucky)
Congregation Agudath Achim Anshai (Freehold, New Jersey), commonly known as the Freehold Jewish Center
Congregation Agudas Achim Anshei Sfard (Newton, Massachusetts), commonly known as The Adams Street Shul 
Congregation Agudas Achim (Livingston Manor, New York)
Congregation Agudas Achim (Bexley, Ohio)
Congregation Agudas Achim (Austin, Texas)
Agudas Achim Congregation (Alexandria, Virginia)
Agudas Achim Congregation (Coralville, Iowa)

See also